The Tonkawa are a Native American tribe indigenous to present-day Oklahoma. Their Tonkawa language,  now extinct, is a linguistic isolate. 

Today, Tonkawa people are enrolled in the federally recognized Tonkawa Tribe of Indians of Oklahoma.

Name
The name Tonkawa is derived from the Waco tribal word, meaning "they all stay together".

Economy
The Tonkawa tribe operates a number of businesses which have an annual economic impact of over $10,860,657 (as of 2011). Along with several smoke shops, the tribe runs 3 different casinos: Tonkawa Indian Casino and Tonkawa Gasino located in Tonkawa, Oklahoma, and the Native Lights Casino in Newkirk, Oklahoma.

Events

The annual Tonkawa Powwow is held on the last weekend in June to commemorate the end of the tribe's own Trail of Tears when the tribe was forcefully removed and relocated from its traditional lands to present-day Oklahoma.

History
Scholars once thought the Tonkawa originated in Central Texas. Recent research, however, has shown that the tribe inhabited northwestern Oklahoma in 1601. By 1700, Apache and Wichita enemies had pushed the Tonkawa south to the Red River which forms the border between current-day Oklahoma and Texas. In the 16th century, the Tonkawa tribe probably had around 1,900 members. Their numbers diminishes to around 1,600 by the late 17th century due to fatalities from new infectious diseases and conflict with other tribes, most notably the Apache. 

In the 1740s, some Tonkawa were involved with the Yojuanes and others as settlers in the San Gabriel Missions of Texas along the San Gabriel River.

In 1758, the Tonkawa along with allied Bidais, Caddos, Wichitas, Comanches, and Yojuanes went to attack the Lipan Apache in the vicinity of Mission Santa Cruz de San Sabá, which they destroyed.

The tribe continued their southern migration into Texas and northern Mexico, where they allied with the Lipan Apache.

In 1824, the Tonkawa entered into a treaty with Stephen F. Austin to protect Anglo-American immigrants against the Comanche. At the time, Austin was an agent recruiting immigrants to settle in the Mexican state of Coahuila y Texas. In 1840 at the Battle of Plum Creek and again in 1858 at the Battle of Little Robe Creek, the Tonkawa fought alongside the Texas Rangers against the Comanche.

The Tonkawas often visited the capital city of Austin during the days of the Republic of Texas and during early statehood.

In 1859, the United States escorted the Tonkawa and a number of other Texas Indian tribes to a new home at the Wichita Agency in Indian Territory, and placed them under the protection of nearby Fort Cobb. When the American Civil War started, the troops at the fort received orders to march to Fort Leavenworth, Kansas, leaving the Indians at the Wichita Agency unprotected.

In response to years of animosity (in part regarding rumors that the Tonkawas engaged in cannibalism  ), a number of pro-Union tribes, including the Delawares, Wichitas, and Penateka Comanches, attacked the Tonkawas as they tried to escape. The fight, known as the Tonkawa Massacre killed nearly half of the remaining Tonkawas, leaving them with little more than 100 people. The tribe returned to Fort Griffin, Texas where they remained for the rest of the Civil War. In October, 1884, the United States removed them, once again, to the new Oakland Agency in northern Indian Territory, where they remain to this day. This journey involved going to Cisco, Texas, where they boarded a railroad train that took them to Stroud in Indian Territory, where they spent the winter at the Sac and Fox Agency. The Tonkawas travelled  to the Ponca Agency, and arrived at nearby Fort Oakland on June 30, 1885.

On October 21, 1891, the tribe signed an agreement with the Cherokee Commission to accept individual allotments of land.

By 1921, only 34 tribal members remained. Their numbers have since recovered to close to 700 in the early 21st century. The Tonkawa Tribe of Oklahoma incorporated under the Oklahoma Indian Welfare Act in 1938.

Tonkawa groups 
The Tonkawa were made up of various groups. These groups are generally counted as Tonkawa:

 Awash
 Choyopan
 Haiwal
 Hatchuknni
 Kwesh
 Mayeye
 Nilhailai
 Ninchopen
 Pakani
 Pakhalateh
 Sanukh
 Talpkweyu
 Titskanwaticha

See also
Eurycea tonkawae

Notes

References

Further reading

External links

 
 

 
Plains tribes
Native American tribes in Oklahoma
Native American tribes in Texas
Federally recognized tribes in the United States
Guadalupe River (Texas)
Kay County, Oklahoma